AF4/FMR2 family member 3 is a protein that in humans is encoded by the AFF3 gene.

Function 

This gene encodes a tissue-restricted nuclear transcriptional activator that is preferentially expressed in lymphoid tissue. Isolation of this protein initially defined a highly conserved LAF4/MLLT2 gene family of nuclear transcription factors that may function in lymphoid development and oncogenesis. In some ALL patients, this gene has been found fused to the gene for MLL. Multiple alternatively spliced transcript variants that encode different proteins have been found for this gene.

References

External links

Further reading